Santa Adélia is a municipality in the state of São Paulo, Brazil. The city has a population of 15,561 inhabitants and an area of 330.9 km². Santa Adélia belongs to the Mesoregion of São José do Rio Preto.

Economy

The Tertiary sector corresponds to 69.91% of Santa Adélia's GDP. The Primary sector is 19.73% of the GDP and the Industry corresponds to 10.36%.

References

Municipalities in São Paulo (state)